I Know is the eleventh studio album by American R&B singer and songwriter Luther Vandross, released in August 1998 (see 1998 in music), and his only one for Virgin Records. It serves as his first album since fulfilling his contract with Epic after the release of his album Your Secret Love (1996). The album features guest appearances from artists such as Cassandra Wilson, Guru, Stevie Wonder, Brandy, Marcella Precise and Bob James.

The album's title track earned Vandross two nominations at the 41st Grammy Awards including for Best Traditional R&B Performance for the aforementioned album and Best Male R&B Vocal Performance for the album's single. The album debuted and peaked at number twenty-six on the US Billboard 200 album chart, becoming his first album since Give Me the Reason (1986) to chart within the top 40 of the albums chart. The album also peaked within the top ten of the R&B Albums chart, reaching number nine. It was later certified gold by the Recording Industry Association of America (RIAA) in late 1998.

Critical reception

AllMusic editor Tim Sheridan found that on Vandross' "Virgin debut, he eases into his groove once again. Whether he's dealing in the easy, gospel-inflected pop of album opener "Keeping My Faith in You" or the jazzy hooks of the title track, Vandross is in command. While the faux hip-hop of "Get It Right" seems a bit forced, the disc is strong overall. R&B doesn't get any glossier." Paul Verna from Billboard felt that I Know was "a testament to what a real love song should be, rather than the bump'n'grind workouts that tend to masquerade as '90s romantic music." In a lukewarm review for Entertainment Weekly Tony Scherman wrote that "despite his having sold 20-plus million records, the latter-day king of R&B romance lacks the distinctiveness, the instantly recognizable sound of the genre’s true heroes [...] Treacle then, treacle now."

Track listing

Charts

Weekly charts

Year-end charts

Certifications

References

1998 albums
Luther Vandross albums
Albums produced by Luther Vandross
Albums produced by Marcus Miller
Virgin Records albums